Lumayo Ka Nga Sa Akin (Get Away from Me) is a series of satirical parody novel by Filipino writer Bob Ong, published in 2011 by Visprint Inc. The book, which was written in a screenplay form, is divided into three parts.

In a recent interview with The Philippine Star, Ong explained that the book is "basically all about the ills of mass media that you wish would change. It's mainly about, but not limited to, Pinoy movies. It's the insanity and absurdity of our lives, our concept of entertainment, misplaced values, commercialism, and thoughtless existence as reflected through our abuse of art. It is laughable, but more deplorable".

Synopsis

The book is divided into three "short films", each one pokes fun to a particular genre.

Bala Sa Bala, Kamao Sa Kamao, Satsat Sa Satsat

The first film in the trilogy centers around Diego, an action star who wants to take revenge against a group of bad guys, also known as "Bandidos" (bandits), after they killed his parents, his wife, Ashley, and everyone  who attended their wedding, just a few moments right after they get married at the beginning of the film. As the story unfolds, Diego, being an action star, gets into misadventures and finds himself in trouble-after-trouble. Unfortunately, Divina Tuazon, a famous actress and Diego's new found leading lady, was kidnapped by the Bandidos. Finally, in an abandoned warehouse (a setting where most of Pinoy action films' final scenes takes place), Diego tries to save Divina from the evil hands of Bandido's merciless and heartless leader named "Bos".

The plot generally follows themes from classic Filipino action movies, as well as  comedy films from the early 1980s to 1990s. For example, Diego's sidekicks, Dodoy and Momoy uses slapstick from time to time, a type of comedy which was very popular in the country for the past decades.

Shake, Shaker, Shakest
A middle-class family was forced to enter and stay in a white haunted house for several days after being stranded in an unfamiliar place. The title is a play on the Shake, Rattle & Roll film series, and the plot is a ludicrous horror film.

Asawa ni Marie

A rags-to-riches story about Marie, a poor girl who has a confusing status in life and love. The plot is similar to Philippine dramas and soap operas, particularly Marimar.

Film adaptation
A film adaptation as a same title under Viva Films was released on January 13, 2016.

References

Philippine satirical novels
Tagalog-language novels
2011 novels
Philippine mystery novels
Books by Bob Ong